Thomas McGroarty  is an American Democratic Party politician who served as the mayor of the city of Wilkes-Barre, Pennsylvania from 1996 to January 5, 2004.

Political career
In 1983, McGroarty was elected to Wilkes-Barre City Council and served for twelve years before his election as mayor.

Mayorship 
McGroarty served as the twenty-second mayor of the City of Wilkes-Barre. He took his mayoral oath of office just after midnight on January 2, 1996, surprising the outgoing mayor.

McGroarty was elected mayor in 1995 and re-elected in 1999. He was the only mayor to be elected both as a Democrat and Republican, having waged a successful write-in campaign as a Republican in 1995. By securing both nominations, McGroarty enjoyed relationships with both Democratic and Republicans officials.

Personal life
McGroarty was from Wilkes-Barre's East End and was born on December 22, 1962. McGroarty graduated from Coughlin High School, Luzerne County Community College, and Bloomsburg University. He was both an officer and enlisted member of the 109th Field Artillery, where he served as service battery commander.

Quotes
 "I don't know what to expect next, maybe a volcano eruption," quoted by The New York Times when major flooding hit parts of the Northeast which included Wilkes-Barre, about three weeks after the mayor took office.

References

Year of birth missing (living people)
Living people
Mayors of Wilkes-Barre, Pennsylvania
Pennsylvania Democrats